Julio César Chávez Jr. vs. Anderson Silva, billed as "Tribute to the Kings", was a professional boxing fight held on June 19, 2021, at the Estadio Jalisco in Guadalajara, Jalisco, Mexico. Former UFC middleweight champion Silva was declared the winner by split decision.

Background

At a March 2021 press conference  Chávez announced his opponent was Anderson Silva who was switching to boxing from MMA.  The fight was to be held on 19 June 2021. Chávez Jr missed the contractual weight of 182 lbs. after weighing in at 184.4 lbs. and forfeited $100,000 of his purse to Silva. Silva won the fight via split decision. Silva was the busier fighter throughout the fight throwing a total of 392 punches versus Chávez Jr's 153.

References 

 2021 in boxing
 June 2021 sports events in Mexico
 Pay-per-view boxing matches
 2021 in Mexican sports